The San Francesco Altarpiece is a c.1517 oil on canvas painting by Romanino, painted for and still on show in the church of San Francesco, Brescia. 

It was produced just after the artist's return from Padua, where he had come into contact with the innovations of Titian at the Scuola del Santo. It shows a Madonna and Child surrounded by Franciscan saints - Francis of Assisi and Anthony of Padua standing either side and Bonaventure, Louis of Toulouse and Bernardino of Siena kneeling at the base with a monk (father Francesco Sanson).

References

Bibliography
 Pierluigi De Vecchi ed Elda Cerchiari, I tempi dell'arte, Milano, Bompiani, 1999, vol. 2. ISBN 88-451-7212-0.

Paintings of Saint Bonaventure
Paintings in Brescia
Paintings of the Madonna and Child
Paintings by Girolamo Romani
Paintings of Francis of Assisi
Paintings of Louis of Toulouse
1517 paintings
Paintings of Anthony of Padua
Paintings of Bernardino of Siena